Qabaqçöl is a village and municipality in the Balakan District of Azerbaijan. It has a population of 1,004. The Avar language is common in Qabaqçöl. The postal code is AZ0816.

References 

Populated places in Balakan District